Alan Michael Gratz (born January 27, 1972) is the author of 17 novels for young adults including Prisoner B-3087, Code of Honor, Grenade, Something Rotten, and Refugee.

Alan Gratz was born in Knoxville, Tennessee. He holds a B.A. in creative writing and a master's degree in English education, both from the University of Tennessee, Knoxville.

Alan Gratz lives in Asheville, North Carolina.

Published works 
Samurai Shortstop (Dial Books, 2006)
Something Rotten (Dial, 2007)
 The Brooklyn Nine: A novel in nine innings (Dial, 2010)
 Fantasy Baseball (Dial, 2011)
 Starfleet Academy: The Assassination Game (Simon Spotlight, 2012)
 Prisoner B-3087 (Scholastic, 2013)
 The League of Seven (Tor Forge, 2014)
 The Dragon Lantern: A League of Seven Novel (Tor Forge, 2015)
 Code of Honor (2015)
 The Monster War: A League of Seven Novel (Tor Forge, 2016)
 Projekt 1065 (Scholastic, 2016)
 Ban This Book (Tor Forge, 2017)
 Refugee (Scholastic, 2017)
 Grenade (Scholastic, 2018)
 Allies (Scholastic, 2019)
 Resist   (Scholastic, 2020)
 Ground Zero (Scholastic, 2021)
 Two Degrees (Scholastic, 2022)

Produced plays
The Legend of Sleepy Hollow (Knoxville Actors Co-op, 2004), adapted from the 1820 short story by Washington Irving
Measured in Labor: The Coal Creek Project (Knoxville Actors Co-op, 2004)
Young Hickory (Knoxville Actors Co-op, 1999)
The Gift of the Magi (Knoxville Actors Co-op, 1999),  adapted from the 1905 short story by O. Henry
Indian Myths and Legends (Knoxville Actors Co-op, 1998)
Sweet Sixteen (Knoxville Actors Co-op, 1998)

Other writing credits
Episodes of the A&E Network show City Confidential
 Somerset, KY: A Killer Campaign (2004)
 Lexington, KY: A Parting Shot (2004)
 Seattle, WA: The Long Walk Home (2004)
 Pikeville, KY: Kentucky Gothic (2005)
 The League of Seven Prequels
"Join, or Die: A League of Seven Short Story" Malaprop's Bookstore exclusive preorder Chapbook (2014)
"Hero of the Five Points" Tor.com exclusive short story (2014)

Grants and awards
Finalist, 2002 Marguerite de Angeli Contest (now known as the Delacorte Dell Yearling Contest for a First Middle-Grade Novel)
Co-winner, 2003 Kimberly Colen Memorial Grant from SCBWI
Winner of the 2017 National Jewish Book Award in the Young Adult Literature category for his book Refugee
Winner of the 2019–2020 Young Hoosier Book Award (Middle Grades) for Refugee
 2020 Buxtehude Bull

References

External links

 
 
 

Living people
1972 births
People from Knoxville, Tennessee
University of Tennessee alumni
21st-century American novelists
American young adult novelists
American television writers
American male television writers
American male novelists
American male screenwriters
American children's writers
21st-century American male writers
Screenwriters from Tennessee
21st-century American screenwriters
Jewish American writers
21st-century American Jews